Guatemala–Uruguay relations refers to the diplomatic relations between Guatemala and Uruguay. Both nations are members of the Community of Latin American and Caribbean States, Group of 77, Organization of American States, Organization of Ibero-American States and the United Nations.

History
Both Guatemala and Uruguay share a common history in the fact that both nations were once part of the Spanish Empire. During the Spanish colonial period, Guatemala was governed from the Viceroyalty of New Spain in Mexico City while Uruguay was then part of the Viceroyalty of the Río de la Plata and administered from Buenos Aires. In 1828, Uruguay obtained its independence after the Cisplatine War. In 1841, Guatemala obtained its independence after the dissolution of the Federal Republic of Central America. In March 1907, both nations established diplomatic relations.

Bilateral relations between both nations have taken place primarily in multilateral forums. In November 2006 Guatemalan Vice-President Eduardo Stein attended the 16th Ibero-American Summit in Montevideo. In November 2018 Uruguayan Vice-President Lucía Topolansky paid a visit to Antigua, Guatemala to attend the 26th Ibero-American Summit.

Bilateral agreements
Both nations have signed several agreements such as an Agreement on Scientific and Technical Cooperation (1987); Cultural Agreement (1987); Agreement on Economic and Commercial Cooperation (1987); Memorandum of Understanding on Political Consultations (2007); Agreement for the Exchange of Information Regarding the Design and Implementation of Drug Policies (2013); Agreement in Academic Cooperation (2013); and an Agreement on Trade and Investment (2019).

Resident diplomatic missions
 Guatemala has an embassy in Montevideo.
 Uruguay has an embassy in Guatemala City.

See also 
 Foreign relations of Guatemala
 Foreign relations of Uruguay

References

 

 
Bilateral relations of Uruguay
Uruguay